Robert "Bob" Shaw Egan (born 1945) is a botanist and lichenologist, specializing in the family Parmeliaceae. He was the president of the American Bryological and Lichenological Society from 1999 to 2001.

Education and career
Robert S. Egan graduated from the University of Colorado Boulder in 1967 with B.A., in 1969 with M.A., and in 1971 with Ph.D. He became an assistant professor at Castleton State College (now called Castleton University) and then from 1975 to 1979 was a faculty member at Texas A&M University. At the University of Nebraska Omaha he joined the faculty in 1979, was promoted to full professor in 1985, and retired there as professor emeritus. From 1989 to 1992 he was the chair of the botany department.

Egan has collected lichens in the U.S., Canada, Mexico, Puerto Rico, Costa Rica, and Guatemala. He is the author or co-author of over 100 scientific publications. He maintains a lichen herbarium with about 17,000 specimens, together with a lichen exchange program. His recent research has focused on "floristic and taxonomic studies of the lichens of Wyoming's Snowy Range, the Big Thicket National Preserve in East Texas, and the Lichen family Parmeliaceae in Mexico."

Eponyms
 Buellia eganii Bungartz
 Xanthoparmelia eganii Elix & T.H.Nash

Selected publications

See also
 :Category:Taxa named by Robert Shaw Egan

References

External links
 

1945 births
Living people
American lichenologists
20th-century American botanists
21st-century American botanists
University of Colorado Boulder alumni
University of Nebraska Omaha faculty